Adonis Uriel Frías (born 17 March 1998) is an Argentine professional footballer who plays as a centre-back for Liga MX club León.

Career
Frías' career began with Defensa y Justicia of the Primera División, becoming a senior member from 2016 having joined their academy in 2004. He was an unused substitute for the club's Copa Sudamericana double-header with El Nacional in mid-2018, which was followed by the defender departing on loan to Primera B Nacional's Los Andes. A home defeat to Sarmiento on 16 September 2018 saw Frías make his pro debut. After nineteen games in 2018–19, Frías returned to Defensa for 2019–20 and began featuring. He scored his first senior goal against Lanús on 23 January 2021 in the 2020 Sudamericana final; which they won.

Career statistics
.

Notes

Honours
Defensa y Justicia
Copa Sudamericana: 2020
Recopa Sudamericana: 2021

References

External links

1998 births
Living people
People from Florencio Varela Partido
Argentine footballers
Association football defenders
Primera Nacional players
Argentine Primera División players
Defensa y Justicia footballers
Club Atlético Los Andes footballers
Sportspeople from Buenos Aires Province